The 1976 Hardy Cup was the 1976 edition of the Canadian intermediate senior ice hockey championship.

Final
Best of 5
Prince George 9 Embrun 5
Embrun 4 Prince George 2
Embrun 9 Prince George 4
Prince George 5 Embrun 4
Embrun 5 Prince George 1
Embrun Panthers beat Prince George Mohawks 3–1 on series.

External links
Hockey Canada

Hardy Cup
Hardy